Surulere is a Local Government Area in Oyo State, Nigeria. Its headquarters is in the town of Iresa-Adu.

It has an area of 23 km and a population of 142,070 at the 2006 census.

Some of the towns in the local government are Oko-Irese, Iresa-Adu, Igbon  and Iresa-Apa. Each of these towns have their own traditional leader with a given royal titles. Royal title for some of the local government towns named above are:
 Oranmiyan of Okoland
 Olugbon of Igbon
 Aresa (dudu) of Iresa-Adu and
 Aresa (pupa) of Iresa-Apa

The main economic activities of the residents of the towns that make up Surulere local government is farming. And the main produce from there farming activity are:
 Calving of Calabash Onirese
 Yam
 Cocoa
 Palm oil
 Maize
 Tobacco

 
The postal code of the area is 210.

References

Local Government Areas in Oyo State